Bruce Walker (born 27 August 1946) is an English former professional footballer who played as a left winger.

Career
Born in Hungerford, Walker played for Swindon Town, Bradford City, Exeter City and Hereford United.

References

1946 births
Living people
English footballers
Swindon Town F.C. players
Bradford City A.F.C. players
Exeter City F.C. players
Hereford United F.C. players
English Football League players
People from Hungerford
Association football midfielders